Dorstenia albertii is a plant species in the family Moraceae which is native to eastern Brazil. The species is only known from a single locality in Espírito Santo state in southeastern Brazil, in a moist, shady site. It is similar to D. grazielae, another Brazilian endemic.

References

albertii
Plants described in 1974
Flora of Brazil